Oxelytrum cayennense is a species of burying beetles or carrion beetles belonging to the family Silphidae.

Description
They have three ridges on each elytron, without hairs on the pronotal disk and without a tooth or only with a small protuberance in the humeral region of the elytra. Elytra are black, with pointed apices. Head has prominent eyes and antennae with a 3-segmented antennal club. Pronotum usually shows a uniform orange-red or yellow color, but often a dark maculae, almost rounded or a little quadrangular-shaped, occupies the center of the pronotal disk.

These carrion beetles are nocturnal. They are commonly associated with decomposing carcasses of animals. Adults feed both on soft tissues of carcasses and on larvae and eggs of flies, while the larvae are strictly scavengers.

Distribution and habitat
This species is present in most of northern and central South America (Bolivia, Brazil, Colombia, Ecuador, French Guiana, Peru, Venezuela). It can be found in lower to middle elevation rain forest habitats.

References

Silphidae
Beetles described in 1826
Beetles of South America